Yann Ehrlacher (born 4 July 1996) is a French auto racing driver who competes in the World Touring Car Cup for Cyan Performance Lynk & Co. He was the 2020 World Touring Car Cup winner and defended the title in 2021. He is the son of former racing driver Cathy Muller and Yves Ehrlacher, a former professional footballer. He is also the nephew of Yvan Muller, quadruple winner of the World Touring Car Championship.

Racing record

Career summary

Complete European Le Mans Series results

Complete World Touring Car Championship results
(key) (Races in bold indicate pole position) (Races in italics indicate fastest lap)

Complete World Touring Car Cup results
(key) (Races in bold indicate pole position) (Races in italics indicate fastest lap)

† Driver did not finish the race, but was classified as he completed over 90% of the race distance.

References

External links
  
 

1996 births
Living people
Sportspeople from Mulhouse
French racing drivers
World Touring Car Championship drivers
World Touring Car Cup drivers
World Touring Car Champions
European Le Mans Series drivers
Le Mans Cup drivers